Łukasz Siemion (born 12 April 1985) is a Polish rower. He competed in the Men's lightweight coxless four event at the 2012 Summer Olympics.

References

External links
 
 

1985 births
Living people
Polish male rowers
Olympic rowers of Poland
Rowers at the 2012 Summer Olympics
People from Wąbrzeźno County
Sportspeople from Kuyavian-Pomeranian Voivodeship
European Rowing Championships medalists